The Hart Hills are a line of low, mainly snow-covered hills in Antarctica,  long, trending east–west. They were observed by Edward Thiel and Campbell Craddock in the course of an airlifted geophysical traverse along the 88th meridian West, December 13, 1959. The name was proposed by them for Pembroke Hart, on the staff of the National Academy of Sciences, and a member of the technical panel on seismology and gravity on the U.S. National Committee for the International Geophysical Year.

References

Hills of Ellsworth Land